Andrea Barrett (born November 16, 1954) is an American novelist and short story writer. Her collection Ship Fever won the 1996 U.S. National Book Award for Fiction, and she received a MacArthur Fellowship in 2001. Her book Servants of the Map was a finalist for the 2003 Pulitzer Prize for Fiction, and Archangel and Natural History were finalists for the Story Prize.

Early life and education
Barrett was born in Boston, Massachusetts. She earned a B.A. in biology from Union College and briefly attended a Ph.D. program in zoology.

Career
Barrett began writing fiction seriously in her thirties, but was relatively unknown until the publication of Ship Fever, a collection of novellas and short stories that won the National Book Award in 1996.

Barrett's work has been published in A Public Space, The Paris Review, Tin House, Ploughshares, One Story, Triquarterly, Salmagundi, The American Scholar, and The Kenyon Review, among other places. Her fiction and essays have been selected for Best American Short Stories, Best American Science Writing, Best American Essays, the PEN/O. Henry Prize Stories, and other anthologies.

Barrett is particularly well known as a writer of historical fiction.  Her work reflects her lifelong interest in science, and women in science.  Many of her characters are scientists, often 19th-century biologists.

Some of her characters have appeared in more than one story or novel.  In an appendix to her novel The Air We Breathe (2007), Barrett supplied a family tree, making clear the characters' relationships that began in Ship Fever.

Barrett was a fellow at the Center for Scholars and Writers at the New York Public Library.  She lives in the eastern Adirondacks, near Lake Champlain.

Her short story collection Natural History was longlisted for the inaugural Carol Shields Prize for Fiction in 2023.

Works

Novels
 (1988) Lucid Stars
 (1989) Secret Harmonies
 (1991) The Middle Kingdom
 (1993) The Forms of Water
 (1998) The Voyage of the Narwhal
 (2007) The Air We Breathe

Short story collections
 (1996) Ship Fever — winner of the National Book Award
 (2002) Servants of the Map — finalist for the Pulitzer Prize
 (2013) Archangel
 (2022) Natural History

References

External links 
 
 
 Audio recording of Andrea Barrett reading from Ship Fever, 2009 Key West Literary Seminar
 "Andrea Barrett, Author of 'Servants of the Map' talks with Robert Birnbaum", Interview, Identity Theory (2002)
 Peter Kurth interview, "Andrea Barett", Salon (1998)
 A sample manuscript page, The Paris Review (2003)

1954 births
Living people
American women novelists
American women short story writers
National Book Award winners
MacArthur Fellows
Union College (New York) alumni
Writers from Boston
20th-century American novelists
21st-century American novelists
20th-century American women writers
21st-century American women writers
20th-century American short story writers
21st-century American short story writers
Novelists from Massachusetts
O. Henry Award winners